Jiří Valeš is a Czechoslovak retired slalom canoeist who competed in the late 1940s. He won a bronze medal in the folding K-1 team event at the 1949 ICF Canoe Slalom World Championships in Geneva.

References

Czechoslovak male canoeists
Possibly living people
Year of birth missing
Medalists at the ICF Canoe Slalom World Championships